Jan Gommers (1 March 1916 – 27 July 2002) was a Dutch racing cyclist. He rode in the 1939 Tour de France.

References

1916 births
2002 deaths
Dutch male cyclists
Place of birth missing